Nikos Kourbanas (born 22 March 1962) is a Greek retired football defender and later manager.

References

1962 births
Living people
People from Velo
Greek footballers
Korinthos F.C. players
Panachaiki F.C. players
Panathinaikos F.C. players
Panionios F.C. players
Marko F.C. players
Greece international footballers
Greek football managers
Aiolikos F.C. managers
Doxa Vyronas F.C. managers
Panachaiki F.C. managers
Kallithea F.C. managers
Fostiras F.C. managers
A.O. Kerkyra managers
Niki Volos F.C. managers
Olympiacos Volos F.C. managers
Vyzas F.C. managers
PAS Lamia 1964 managers
Panegialios F.C. managers
Kalamata F.C. managers
Paniliakos F.C. managers
Ethnikos Piraeus F.C. managers
Rodos F.C. managers
Irodotos FC managers
Association football defenders
Footballers from the Peloponnese